Ramakrishna Reddy Nallamilli is an Indian politician from the Telugu Desam Party. He is an ex-member of the Andhra Pradesh Legislative Assembly from Anaparthy constituency. He is the son of former member of the legislative assembly (MLA) Nallamilli Moola Reddy. He ranked first place among 175 MLAs in an ABN Channel survey.

He conducted a programme in his constituency to solve people's problems and to interact with them directly, naming it Mana Intiki Mana MLA. This programme inspired chief minister Chandra Babu Naidu, who implemented it statewide and named it Inti Intiki MLA. From 2014, Nallamilli developed his constituency with 5 billion and from 2018 to 2019, he planned development with another 1.50 billion. He developed government hospitals and schools.

References

Year of birth missing (living people)
Living people
Telugu Desam Party politicians
Members of the Andhra Pradesh Legislative Assembly